The Diocese of the Free State is a diocese in the Anglican Church of Southern Africa.

History
The first service North of the Orange River to be taken by an Anglican clergyman was conducted in 1850 by †Robert Gray, the first Bishop of Cape Town.  In 1863, Edward Twells was consecrated the first Bishop of the Orange Free State and the Diocese was born. This new Diocese covered the area North of the Orange River, West of the Drakensberg and as far as the Zambezi River in the North.
 
The bishop arrived in Bloemfontein on 1 October 1863, with three priests and two teachers. George Mitchell was the first priest ordained in the Diocese, in 1865.  The Cathedral was completed and consecrated in 1866.  The Brotherhood of St Augustine of Hippo was established in the diocese a year later with Canon Beckett and seven members.  Together they built  the first Anglican church in Thaba Nchu, completed in 1868.  This pioneering community established the Church’s work in Thaba Nchu and in places as far apart as Wepener and Harrismith and continued faithfully from their house at Modderpoort until their work was taken over by the Society of the Sacred Mission in 1902.
 
The first Diocesan Synod met in 1872 and a good foundation was laid for the organizational side of the Church’s work.  Two years later the need for Sisters for nursing, teaching and visiting was recognised and the Community of St Michael and All Angels was founded in Bloemfontein.  Furthermore, the Transvaal became no longer the responsibility of Bloemfontein when the Anglican Diocese of Pretoria was formed in 1878.  Then in 1891 the scope of the diocese again changed with the formation of the Anglican Diocese of Mashonaland.
  
In 1899, the year the Anglo Boer war broke out (Boer Wars), the diocesan bishop, Wale Hicks, died. Allan Webb resigned the See of Grahamstown and came back to look after his old diocese until a new bishop could be elected.
  
The first missionary conference was held in the Cathedral in 1904.  Some years later, to aid the mission work of the church and oversight, the Anglican Diocese of Kimberley and Kuruman was established in 1911.  This was repeated again in 1950 with the formation of the Anglican Diocese of Lesotho (then, Basutoland) and in 1952, with the founding of the Anglican Diocese of Matabeleland.  In 2003 the diocese changed its name to the Diocese of the Free State.

The seat of the diocese is in Bloemfontein in South Africa.

Archdeaconries 
The Free State Diocese is divided into 8 archdeaconries. The biggest archdeaconry being Goldfields. The archdeaconries are :

·        Bloemfontein Archdeaconry

·        Greater Bloemfontein Archdeaconry

·        Sasolburg Archdeaconry

·        Goldfields Archdeaconry

·        Maluti Archdeaconry

·        South West Free State Archdeaconry

·        Far Eastern Free State Archdeaconry

-        Kroonstad Archdeaconry

Parishes 
The diocese has a total of 69 parishes which are :

Parishes 
·        St Agatha in Bultfontein

·        St Luke in Hennenman

·        St Peter & St Paul in Hertzogville

·        St Michael in Hoopstad

·        Holy Cross in Odendaalsrus

·        St Mary in Odendaalsrus

·        St Barnabas in Theunissen

·        St Mark in Ventersburg

·        St Alban in Virginia

·        St Matthew in Virginia

·        Annunciation in Welkom

·        St Matthias in Welkom

·        St Peter & St Paul in Welkom

·        Church of Grace in Welkom

·        St Clement in Winburg

·        St Paul in Arlington

·        St Aidan in Bethlehem

·        St Augustine’s in Bethlehem

·        St Joph The Baptist in Harrismith

·        Transfiguration in Harrismith

·        Tsiame in Harrismith

·        St Matthew in Paul Roux

·        African Martyrs in Phuthaditjhaba

·        Holy Cross in Reitz

·        St Mark in Vrede

·        Church of The Visitation in Warden

·        Bernard The Martyr in Witzieshoek

·        St Andrew in Botshabelo

·        St Anthony in Botshabelo

·        St Mary the Virgin in Botshabelo

·        St Matthew in Botshabelo

·        St Thomas in Botshabelo

·        St Augustine’s in Thaba Nchu

·        St Lawrence in Thaba Nchu

·        Cathedral of St. Andrew and St. Michaels in Bloemfontein

·        Holy Cross in Bloemfontein

·        St Margaret in Bloemfontein

·        St Patrick in Bloemfontein

·        St Peter in Bloemfontein

·        St Philip in Bloemfontein

·        St Clare in Bothaville

·        St George in Kroonstad

·        The Resurrection in Kroonstad

·        St Joan in Viljoenskroon

·        Holy Redeemer in Clocolan

·        All Saints in Ficksburg

·        St Paul in Ficksburg

·        St Mark & St George in Senekal

·        St James in Ladybrand

·        St Mary & St Joseph in Ladybrand

·        St Columba in Marquard

·        Tweespruit Anglican Church in Tweespruit

·        St Stephen in Hilbron

·        St Edwards in Parys

·        St Mary in Parys

·        St Michael & All Angels in Sasolburg

·        St Peter in Sasolburg

·        St John in Fauriesmith

·        St James in Jagersfontein

·        Good Shepard in Koffiefontein

·        St Mary in Luckhoff

·        St Oswalds in Philippolis

·        St Saviors in Springfontein

·        St George in Trompsburg

·        St Felicitas in Dewetsdorp

·        St Paul in Rouxville

·        St Peter in Smithfield

·        St John in Wepener

·        St Athanasius in Zastron

List of bishops

Assistant bishops
In 1940, S. J. Haynes was Assistant Bishop of the diocese; he had been in post since his October 1923 consecration as a bishop. By 1942, Thomas Stainton had been assistant bishop since 1941.

Coat of arms 
The diocese assumed arms shortly after its inception.  They were formally granted by the College of Arms in 1951, and registered at the Bureau of Heraldry in 1992 : Azure,  a  saltire  Argent  surmounted of a flaming  sword erect proper; the shield ensigned of a mitre proper.

References

External links
 

1863 establishments in the Orange Free State
Anglican Church of Southern Africa dioceses
Anglican bishops of the Free State